Berezovka is a rural locality (a selo) and the administrative center of Beryozovsky Selsoviet, Pervomaysky District, Altai Krai, Russia. The population was 57 as of 2013. There are 6 streets.

Geography 
Berezovka is located 6 km east of Novoaltaysk (the district's administrative centre) by road. Bazhevo and Solnechnoye are the nearest rural localities.

References 

Rural localities in Pervomaysky District, Altai Krai